was a Japanese international table tennis player.

Table tennis career
From 1955 to 1957 he won several medals in singles, doubles, and team events in the World Table Tennis Championships.

He also won an English Open title.

The nine World Championship medals included five gold medals; two in the singles at the 1955 World Table Tennis Championships and 1957 World Table Tennis Championships and three in the team event for Japan.

Legacy
After the 1955 World Championships Tanaka became popular in the Netherlands, where on 30 May 1969 Rien van Thoor and Marius van Rijckevorsel established the table tennis club TTV Tanaka in Etten-Leur. The club still exists and never changed its name.

In 1997 Tanaka was inducted into the ITTF Hall of Fame.

See also
 List of table tennis players
 List of World Table Tennis Championships medalists

References

Japanese male table tennis players
1935 births
1998 deaths
Asian Games medalists in table tennis
Table tennis players at the 1958 Asian Games
Asian Games silver medalists for Japan
Medalists at the 1958 Asian Games
Sportspeople from Hokkaido